Cwm Bargoed railway station served the village of Fochriw, in the Taff Bargoed valley of Caerphilly County Borough, Wales, from 1876 to 1964 on the Rhymney Railway.

History 
The station opened on 1 February 1876 by the Rhymney Railway. Nearby were various mines, which was situated on a mineral branch, and Cwm Bargoed Colliery. By the end of 1924, the colliery and most of the mines had closed. The mineral line closed in 1937, most of the remains being lost in the Cwm Bargoed Washery. The station closed on 15 June 1964. The tracks still remain, which are used to transport coal from the Ffos-y-fran Land Reclamation Scheme.

References

External links 

Railway stations in Great Britain opened in 1876
Railway stations in Great Britain closed in 1964
1876 establishments in Wales
1964 disestablishments in Wales
Former Rhymney Railway stations